The 2018 GP La Marseillaise was the 39th edition of the Grand Prix La Marseillaise cycle race and was held on 28 January 2018. The race started and finished in Marseille. The race was won by Alexandre Geniez.

Teams
Sixteen teams were invited to take part in the race. These included two UCI WorldTeams, ten UCI Professional Continental teams and four UCI Continental teams.

General classification

References

2018 in French sport
2018 UCI Europe Tour
Grand Prix La Marseillaise